Giancarlo Agazzi (August 22, 1932 – September 26, 1995) was an Italian ice hockey player.

Considered one of the best Italian hockey players of all time, he played mostly with teams from Milan: HC Amatori Milano, HC Milano, Milan-Inter HC and Diavoli HC Milano. He won the Serie A six times and the Spengler Cup twice. He also played 120 games with Italy men's national ice hockey team, scoring 54 goals. He represented Italy in two Winter Olympics: Cortina d'Ampezzo 1956 and Innsbruck 1964.

After retiring from play, he became a coach, then a member of the Lombard committee of Federazione Italiana Sport del Ghiaccio.

References

1932 births
1995 deaths
HC Milano players
Milan-Inter HC players
Ice hockey players at the 1956 Winter Olympics
Ice hockey players at the 1964 Winter Olympics
Italian ice hockey right wingers
Olympic ice hockey players of Italy
Ice hockey people from Milan